My Old Man is a 1979 American made-for-television drama film starring Kristy McNichol, Warren Oates and Eileen Brennan, directed by John Erman. The film, written by Jerome Kass, was based on the Ernest Hemingway 1923 short story "My Old Man", which had previously been adapted for the 1950 film Under My Skin. The TV film was originally broadcast on CBS on December 7, 1979.

Plot
Frank Butler is a cantankerous unlucky horse trainer who wins big at the track and buys a horse for his jockey daughter Jo in an attempt to reconcile their troubled relationship.

Cast
Kristy McNichol - Jo Butler
Warren Oates - Frank Butler
Eileen Brennan - Marie
Joseph Maher - Phil Kiley
Joseph Leon - Shimmy
Jess Osuna - Matt
David Margulies - Chubby
Mark Arnold - Roy Kiley
Michael Jeter - George Gardner

External links

1979 television films
1979 films
1970s sports drama films
American sports drama films
CBS network films
Films based on works by Ernest Hemingway
Films directed by John Erman
American horse racing films
American drama television films
1970s English-language films
1970s American films